Fateh Singh 
(25 February 1699 – 28 December 1704 or 12 December 1705), commonly referred to with honorifics as Baba Fateh Singh or Sahibzada Baba Fateh Singh, was the fourth and youngest son of Guru Gobind Singh. He was born at the spot marked by the modern-day Gurdwara Bhora Sahib, Anandpur and was reared in the same locality. He was raised by his paternal grandmother, Mata Gujri, after the passing of his mother in December 1700. He was executed in Sirhind, alongside his elder brother Zorawar Singh, by being entombed alive in a brick wall and after they fell unconscious, they were taken out of the wall and killed. Guru Gobind Singh learnt of the deaths of his sons, Fateh Singh and Zorowar Singh, while he was staying at the village of Jatpura. Mata Gujri is claimed to have died of shock on hearing of the deaths of her two youngest grandsons. Fateh Singh is among the most hallowed martyrs in Sikhism.

Death 
Some Sikh accounts note Singh's two younger sons — Zorowar Singh and Fateh Singh — to have successfully fought at Chamkaur before being captured. Other accounts note that they along with their grandmother had been separated from the Sikh retinue while migrating away from Anandapur; subsequently, handed over to the Mughals.

The sons were taken to Sirhind and coerced for conversion to Islam in the court of Wazir Khan, the provincial governor. Both of the children maintained a steadfast refusal to convert and were executed. In early Sikh accounts, they were simply beheaded; in popular Sikh tradition, they are held to have been "bricked" (entombed) alive.

Legacy 
According to one theory regarding the genesis of the Akali Nihang tradition, they stem from Fateh Singh, with their characteristic blue garbs and turbans tracing their origin to the uniform of Fateh Singh and being prescribed by Guru Gobind Singh for his warriors.

Gallery

See also 
Ajit Singh (half-brother)
Jujhar Singh (brother)
Zorawar Singh (brother) 
Martyrdom in Sikhism 
Dumalla

References 

Sikh martyrs
Family members of the Sikh gurus
History of Punjab
Rai Singh, Fateh
People executed by the Mughal Empire
Executed children
18th-century executions in India
Punjabi people
People executed by starvation
1699 births
1705 deaths
Executed Indian people